Chateau de Orquevaux is a French château and a historical landmark. It is a private home and an international Artists & Writers residency. It is located in Orquevaux—a commune in the Haute-Marne department in north-eastern France.



History 
[[File:Caroillon de Vandeul Family crest Famille Caroillon Orquevaux.png|thumb|183x183px|Caroillon de Vandeul Family crest]]

In the 1760s Abel Caroillon de Vandeul acquired the Chateau and surrounding grounds, as well as a farm, furnace, and metal forge. His son Denis was a master blacksmith and French politician. After Abel Caroillon de Vandeul's acquisition of these properties, his son Denis managed the forge in Orquevaux.

On September 9, 1772 the daughter of Denis Diderot (1713–1784) Marie-Angelique Diderot(1753–1824) married Abel Nicolas Francois Caroillon du Vandeul (1746–1813).
Abel and Marie had 2 children: Anne Marie, who died at infancy, and Denis Simon (1775–1850), who was named after his grandfather.
The Caroillon du Vandeul family operated the metal forge and stove for around 100 years. It closed in the mid-nineteenth century.

The original Chateau d'Orquevaux was built in the early 1700s in the style of Louis XV.
For his uncle Charles Denis (Albert) du Vandeul, Le Baron Jacques Le Vavasseur worked with the architect to design and build the present chateau as a hunting lodge including the Parc grounds, and outbuildings in the style of Napoleon III.

Vintage Postcards gallery

Present time 
Château Orquevaux is a private residence now owned by the Attias family. The Château is a private home and also operates an International Artists & Writers Residency program, hosting visual artists, writers and musicians from around the world. Ziggy Attias, Châtelain, is an artist, award-winning filmmaker and the founder and director of the Chateau Orquevaux Art Residency since 2015. “Our mission is to create an international environment where all artists are welcome. A safe place to explore, contemplate and share ideas. A place without judgement, where all artists are free of explaining themselves. We aim to empower the creative spirit in its many forms, which in the process, has created a vibrant artistic community. The Chateau d'Orquevaux Artist Residency emphasizes the human experience and the creative process. The residency creates an environment for the artist in their quest for personal growth and artistic expression, while reinforcing that the end product is not necessarily the principal focus. Life is a creative journey and we consider every moment a part of the process.”

Gallery

Exterior

Interior

References 

 Flammarion,Camille The Unknown
 Carl Edward Glock(1918)History of the 316th Regiment of Infantry in the World War, 1918
 "Baron LEVAVASSEUR"
 "Stables Blueprint 1878"
 "Soiree-Chateao D'Orquevaux 1896"
 The life of Denis Diderot and family tree , "La vie Denis Diderot"

Châteaux in Haute-Marne